The Cessna Skymaster is an American twin-engine civil utility aircraft built in a push-pull configuration. Its engines are mounted in the nose and rear of its pod-style fuselage. Twin booms extend aft of the wings to the vertical stabilizers, with the rear engine between them. The horizontal stabilizer is aft of the pusher propeller, mounted between and connecting the two booms.  The combined tractor and pusher engines produce centerline thrust and a unique sound. The Cessna O-2 Skymaster is a military version of the Cessna 337 Super Skymaster.

Development

The first Skymaster, Model 336 Skymaster, had fixed landing gear and initially flew on February 28, 1961. It went into production in May 1963 with 195 being produced through mid-1964.

In February 1965, Cessna introduced the Model 337 Super Skymaster. The model was larger, and had more powerful engines, retractable landing gear, and a dorsal air scoop for the rear engine. (The "Super" prefix was subsequently dropped from the name.) In 1966, the turbocharged T337 was introduced, and in 1973, the pressurized P337G entered production.

Cessna built 2993 Skymasters of all variants, including 513 military O-2 versions. Production in America ended in 1982, but was continued by Reims in France, with the FTB337 STOL and the military FTMA Milirole.

Design

The Skymaster handles differently from a conventional twin-engine aircraft, primarily in that if an engine fails, the plane will not yaw toward that engine. Without the issue of differential thrust inherent to conventional (engine-on-wing) twins, engine failure on takeoff will not produce yaw from the runway heading.  With no one-engine-out minimum controllable speed (Vmc), in-flight control at any flying speed with an engine inoperative is not as critical as it is with engines on the wing with the associated leverage; however, performance in speed and, particularly, rate of climb are affected. Flying a Skymaster requires a pilot to hold a multiengine rating, although many countries issue a special "centerline thrust rating" for the Skymaster and other similarly configured aircraft.

Ground handling requires certain attention and procedures. The rear engine tends to overheat and can quit while taxiing on very hot days. Accidents have occurred when the runway is shorter than the single-engine take-off roll and pilots, unaware of a rear engine shutdown, have attempted take-off on the nose engine alone. Federal Aviation Administration Airworthiness Directive 77-08-05 prohibits single-engine take-offs and requires the installation of a placard marked "DO NOT INITIATE SINGLE ENGINE TAKEOFF".

The Skymaster's unique sound is made by its rear pusher propeller slicing through turbulent air from the front propeller and over the airframe while its front tractor propeller addresses undisturbed air.

Operational history
From 1976 until the middle 1990s, the California Department of Forestry and Fire Protection used O-2 variants of the 337 Skymaster as tactical aircraft during firefighting operations. These were replaced with North American OV-10 Broncos, starting in 1993.

Brothers to the Rescue

From 1991 until 2001 the Cuban exile group Hermanos al Rescate (Brothers to the Rescue) used Skymasters, among other aircraft, to fly search and rescue missions over the Florida Straits looking for rafters attempting to cross the straits to defect from Cuba, and when they found them, dropped life-saving supplies to them. Rescues were coordinated with the US Coast Guard, which worked closely with the group.  They chose Skymasters because their high wing offered better visibility of the waters below, they were reliable and easy to fly for long-duration missions (averaging 7 hours), and they added a margin of safety with twin-engine centerline thrust.  In 1996, two of the Brothers to the Rescue Skymasters were shot down by the Cuban Air Force over international waters.  Both aircraft were downed by a MiG-29, while a second jet fighter, a MiG-23, orbited nearby.

Variants

Cessna
 

327 Baby Skymaster - reduced scale four-seat version of the 337, with cantilever wings replacing the 336/337 strut-braced configuration. It first flew in December 1967. One prototype was built before the project was cancelled in 1968 due to lack of commercial interest in the design. The prototype was delivered to NASA to serve as a full-scale model for wind tunnel testing. It was used in a joint Langley Research Center and Cessna project on noise reduction and the use of ducted versus free propellers.
336 Skymaster - production version powered by two  Continental IO-360-A engines, 195 built.
337 Super Skymaster - 336; retractable undercarriage, redesigned nose cowling and new rear engine intake, and greater wing angle of incidence, powered by two  Continental IO-360-C engines, 239 built.
 - 337; minor detail changes, 255 built.
 - 337A; increased take-off gross weight, optional belly cargo pack, 230 built.
 - 337B; new instrument panel and increased take-off gross-weight, 223 built.
 - 337C; minor detail changes, 215 built.
 - 337D; cambered wingtips and minor changes, 100 built.
 - 337E; increased take-off gross weight, 114 built.
 - 337F; split airstair entry door, smaller rear side windows, improved flaps, larger front propeller, powered by Continental IO-360-G engines, 352 built.
P337G Super Skymaster - 337G; pressurized cabin and turbocharged engines, 292 built.
 - 337G; minor changes and optional turbocharged engines, 136 built.
P337H Pressurized Skymaster - T337G; minor changes, 64 built.
337M - US military version designated O-2 Skymaster in service, 513 built.
O-2A - US military designation of the 337M Forward air control, observation aircraft for the US Air Force. 501 delivered to the USAF and 12 to the Imperial Iranian Air Force
O-2B: Psychological warfare version for the US Air Force (31 former civil aircraft were converted to O-2B standard).
O-2T: Twin-turboprop version of O-2, with two 317 hp (236 kW) Allison 250-B15 engines, a longer span wing and improved high lift devices.
O-2TT: Improved twin turboprop forward air control aircraft, with same wing (43 ft 0 in (13.11 m) wing and engines of O-2T but with new forward fuselage with tandem seating for pilot and observer to give improved view.
Summit Sentry O2-337 : Military version.
Lynx: Armed military version for the Rhodesian Air Force.
T337H-SP

Reims Cessna

F337E Super Skymaster,  24 built.
F337F Super Skymaster,  31 built.
F337G Super Skymaster,  29 built.
FT337G Super Skymaster, 22 built.
F337H Super Skymaster,   1 built.
FP337H Pressurized Skymaster, 1 built.
FTB337G Milirole; military F337G with Sierra Industries Robertson STOL modifications and underwing hardpoints, 61 built.
Lynx : Rhodesian designation for 21 FTB337Gs delivered to the Rhodesian Air Force.

Conversions/modifications
AVE Mizar - flying car, created by Advanced Vehicle Engineers, was an attachment of Skymaster wings, tail, and rear engine to a Ford Pinto outfitted with aircraft controls and instruments.
Conroy Stolifter - an extensive single-turboprop engine STOL cargo plane conversion of the Skymaster. Front engine was replaced with a Garrett AiResearch TPE-331 turboprop; rear engine was removed, and its space filled with an extended cargo pod.
Groen RevCon 6-X - test conversion of a Cessna 337 Skymaster airplane. This aircraft conversion tested the theory of using fixed-wing airplanes as the basic airframes for gyroplanes to reduce cost and shorten development time.
Summit Sentry - Summit Aviation of Middletown, Delaware re-manufactured existing used 337 airframes into the militarized O2-337 which includes four wing-mounted NATO standard pylons capable of carrying 350 lb (159 kg) each for 7.62 mm and 12.7 mm gun pods, rocket launchers, bombs, markers and flares. The aircraft was marketed for the target identification and marking, reconnaissance, helicopter escort and aerial photography roles. Examples were sold to the Haitian Air Force, Honduras, Nicaragua, Senegal and the Thai Navy. The variant was still in production in 1987.
Spectrum SA-550 - built by Spectrum Aircraft Corporation of Van Nuys, California, it was an extensive single-turboprop engine conversion of a Reims FTB337G constructed in the mid 1980s. They removed the nose engine, lengthened the nose, and replaced the rear engine with a turboprop.
 VoltAero is a startup company formed in September 2017 by the CTO and test pilot of the 2014 Airbus E-Fan 1.0. The company has been established in Royan, with support from the French Nouvelle-Aquitaine region. It is developing a hybrid electric aircraft testbed based on the Skymaster, which is intended to fly in late February 2019. It will be followed up by the VoltAero Cassio prototype in 2020, a clean-sheet, all-composite design.
 Ampaire Electric EEL: a hybrid electric aircraft with the rear piston engine replaced by an electric motor powered by a battery, in a parallel hybrid configuration. The demonstrator first flew on 6 June 2019, before Hawaiian regional carrier Mokulele Airlines experiment connecting Maui airports with the aircraft.

Military operators

Former military operators

Specifications (337D)

See also

References

Taylor, John W. R. Jane's All The World's Aircraft 1969–70. London: Sampson Low, Marston & Company, 1969. .
 "World Air Forces 2004". Flight International, 16–22 November 2004. pp. 41–100.

External links

 Photo of the Cessna 327 Baby Skymaster

Skymaster
Twin-engined push-pull aircraft
1960s United States civil utility aircraft
Twin-boom aircraft
High-wing aircraft
Aircraft first flown in 1961